Benjamin Uphoff (born 8 August 1993) is a German professional footballer who plays as a goalkeeper for Bundesliga club SC Freiburg.

Career
On 26 August 2014, Uphoff joined VfB Stuttgart II on loan from 1. FC Nürnberg until the end of the 2014–15 season. On 25 October 2014, he made his debut for Stuttgart II in the 3. Liga against SpVgg Unterhaching. He signed a permanent deal with VfB Stuttgart on 31 August 2015.

In July 2020, media reported Uphoff would join Bundesliga side SC Freiburg from 2. Bundesliga club Karlsruher SC. This was confirmed in August.

References

External links
 
 

1993 births
Living people
German footballers
Association football goalkeepers
1. FC Nürnberg players
1. FC Nürnberg II players
VfB Stuttgart II players
Karlsruher SC players
SC Freiburg players
Bundesliga players
2. Bundesliga players
3. Liga players
Regionalliga players
People from Burghausen, Altötting
Sportspeople from Upper Bavaria
Footballers from Bavaria